Da'i Bachtiar (born 25 January 1950) was Chief of the Indonesian National Police from 2001 to 2005.

On 15 October 2002, he announced that Indonesian investigators at the scene of the Bali bombing had recovered traces of C-4 plastic explosives. It is rumoured that there was rivalry between Bachtiar and intelligence chief Hendropriyono. After Amrozi had been arrested Bachtiar had a face-to-face meeting with him. Bachtiar laughed, shook hands and posed for photographs with Amrozi.

Currently Bachtiar holds positions as a Professor of Security & Counter-Terrorism at Edith Cowan University and Presidium Chairman of Indonesia Crime Prevention Foundation.

Honours 
: Honorary Officer of the Order of Australia (A.O.)
: Honorary Commander of the Order of Loyalty to the Crown of Malaysia - Tan Sri (P.S.M.) (2003)

External links
Profile at TokohIndonesia.com (In Indonesian)
 Indonesia Crime Prevention Foundation

References

1951 births
Living people
People from Indramayu
Sundanese people
Chiefs of police
Honorary Officers of the Order of Australia
Honorary Commanders of the Order of Loyalty to the Crown of Malaysia
Ambassadors of Indonesia to Malaysia